is a Japanese professional ice hockey center currently playing for the Oji Eagles of the Asia League.

He began his professional career in 2003-2004, at the American ECHL, playing for the Peoria Rivermen, Charlotte Checkers and Augusta Lynx; later he played for the Kokudo/Seibu Prince Rabbits between 2004 and 2009; for the Nippon Paper Cranes from 2009 to 2014; and since 2014, the (Oji Eagles.

He also has played for the Japan national team since 2000 (Japan U20 and Senior).

External links
 
 Cranes's player profile 

1981 births
Living people
Japanese ice hockey centres
People from Kushiro, Hokkaido
Augusta Lynx players
Charlotte Checkers (1993–2010) players
Kokudo Keikaku players
Nippon Paper Cranes players
Oji Eagles players
Peoria Rivermen (ECHL) players
Seibu Prince Rabbits players
Sportspeople from Hokkaido
Asian Games gold medalists for Japan
Medalists at the 2003 Asian Winter Games
Medalists at the 2007 Asian Winter Games
Ice hockey players at the 2003 Asian Winter Games
Ice hockey players at the 2007 Asian Winter Games
Asian Games medalists in ice hockey